Ronald Dean McDowell Sr. (born March 25, 1950) is an American country music artist, songwriter, and actor. He is best known for his 1977 song "The King Is Gone", a tribute to Elvis Presley, who had recently died. From that single onward, McDowell charted more than thirty Top 40 hits on the Billboard country music charts, though he never experienced further pop success after "The King is Gone." Two of his singles – "Older Women" and "You're Gonna Ruin My Bad Reputation" — reached Number One on the country charts, while eleven more reached Top Ten. He has also released more than twenty studio albums, and has been signed to Curb Records since 1986.

U.S. Navy
McDowell served in the US Navy from 1968-72. He served on board the USS Hancock and USS Kitty Hawk.

Career
Following the death of Elvis Presley in 1977, McDowell, a devoted fan of Presley’s, recorded a song that became his first country and only pop hit with his self-penned tribute song "The King Is Gone," which he recorded on the independent Scorpion record label. The record took off immediately, gaining airplay on country and pop radio stations across the United States and around the world.

It peaked at number thirteen on Billboard's Hot 100 singles, and became a gold record. In January 1978, McDowell performed the song on the NBC special, Nashville Remembers Elvis on His Birthday, in which he appeared alongside a number of Presley's contemporaries. To date, "The King Is Gone" has sold more than five million copies.

McDowell was commissioned to cover a number of Presley's songs for the soundtrack to 1979 made-for-TV Presley biography film Elvis, during which Kurt Russell, portraying Presley, lip-synched to McDowell's vocals. He actually recorded 36 songs, but not all of them were used in the film. McDowell also sang the Presley vocals for the 1981 TV movie Elvis and the Beauty Queen and for the 1988 TV miniseries Elvis and Me.

All of the Presley's vocals for the 1990 TV series, Elvis, were performed by McDowell. McDowell also contributed to the 1997 Showtime special, Elvis Meets Nixon. He scored a second hit for the Scorpion label entitled "I Love You, I Love You, I Love You" before being signed by CBS Records Epic in 1979.

McDowell charted a string of hit singles and albums for Epic between 1979 and 1986.  Every single release, except one, became a Top 10 hit, including "Older Women" and "You're Gonna Ruin My Bad Reputation". Other hits during his Epic years included "Watching Girls Go By", "Personally", "You Made A Wanted Man Of Me", "Wandering Eyes", "All Tied Up", and "In a New York Minute".

Moving to Curb Records in 1986, McDowell scored a Top 10 hit with "It's Only Make Believe", a duet with Conway Twitty on what had been Twitty's breakthrough rock and roll hit in 1958.  Initially a member of McDowell's back-up band would substitute for Twitty during live performances. Recently, however, McDowell has performed the song live with Twitty's pre-recorded voice, followed by a solo from a member of the back-up band.

In 1988, he teamed with Jerry Lee Lewis for a duet that McDowell wrote, entitled "You're Never Too Old To Rock N' Roll". He recorded yet another Top 10 hit with his cover version of the pop standard "Unchained Melody," which also became a No. 1 country music video. He started appearing in larger venues and touring before headlining his own shows.

In 2002, McDowell recorded two albums for Curb Records, one consisting of beach music with Rock & Roll Hall of Famer Bill Pinkney's Original Drifters, Ronnie McDowell with Bill Pinkney's Original Drifters. The second project, a country album, entitled Ronnie McDowell Country, a collection of six new McDowell penned songs and a few country standards.

In January 2017, McDowell collaborated with Richard Lynch on a military tribute duet "Love Tattoo".

On January 17, 2018, he unveiled "The Magic Moment", his original painting of Presley getting his first guitar at the Tupelo Hardware Store in Tupelo, thus kicking off the pilot for his forthcoming TV show, entitled Ronnie McDowell Painting America.

On January 22, 2019, McDowell was inducted into the Mississippi Music Project Hall of Fame in Biloxi, Mississippi and was awarded the MMP Music Award for his lifelong commitment to the music industry.

Personal life
Ronnie McDowell resides in Hendersonville, Tennessee. He has five children. His son, Tyler Dean McDowell, was also signed to Curb Records. Another son, Ronnie Jr. and a nephew, Chris, recorded in a band called Six Shooter on Curb in 1991.

Discography

References

External links
Ronnie McDowell official website

1950 births
American country singer-songwriters
American male singer-songwriters
Curb Records artists
Living people
Singer-songwriters from Tennessee
Epic Records artists
MCA Records artists
People from Portland, Tennessee
Country musicians from Tennessee